Stories of a Generation – with Pope Francis is a 4-part 2021 documentary miniseries.

Episodes

Episode 1 includes conversations with Pope Francis, Martin Scorsese, Jane Goodall and others, as they explore on the power of love in their life stories.

Release 
Stories of a Generation – with Pope Francis was released on December 25, 2021, on Netflix.

References

External links 
 
 

Netflix original documentary television series
English-language Netflix original programming